Metasia typhodes is a moth in the family Crambidae. It was described by Turner in 1908. It is found in Australia, where it has been recorded from Queensland.

The wingspan is about 16 mm. The forewings are fuscous with darker lines. The hindwings are also fuscous, with a single transverse darker line
from tornus to the costa.

References

Moths described in 1908
Metasia